Sid-Ahmed Slimani (born 4 November 1958) is an Algerian football manager and the current head coach of WA Tlemcen.

References

1958 births
Living people
Algerian football managers
ASO Chlef managers
USM Annaba managers
MC Oran managers
Olympique de Médéa managers
RC Kouba managers
ASM Oran managers
USM Bel Abbès managers
USM El Harrach managers
Algerian Ligue Professionnelle 1 managers
21st-century Algerian people